Mumbai Rockets is a franchise badminton team representing Mumbai in the Premier Badminton League (PBL). The franchise is owned by Bombay Badminton Pvt. Ltd. The team's home ground is The National Sports Club Of India, Mumbai. The team is captained by Parupalli Kashyap, and coached by Amrish Shinde.

Current squad

Indian players

Foreign players

References

Premier Badminton League teams
Sport in Mumbai